The Cocasset River is a small river in Foxborough, Massachusetts. It flows approximately 4.7 miles (7.5 km) in a southwesterly direction to where it joins the Wading River near Green Street. It is a tributary of the Taunton River.

See also
Taunton River Watershed

References

Rivers of Norfolk County, Massachusetts
Taunton River watershed
Foxborough, Massachusetts
Rivers of Massachusetts